The 2021–22 season was Pafos's 8th year in existence, and fifth season in the Cypriot First Division.

Season review
On 21 June, Pafos announced the signing of Jeisson Palacios from Santa Fe, with Willy Semedo to a two-year contract from Grenoble the following day and Douglas Aurélio joining from Estoril Praia on 23 June.

On 29 June, Pafos announced the signing of Bruno Leite from Haugesund, with the transfer becoming official on 1 August.

On 30 June, Darko Milanič was appointed as Pafos' new Head Coach.

On 14 July, Pafos announced the signing of Deni Hočko from Mouscron for an undisclosed fee.

On 23 July, Pafos announced the signing of Kenan Bajrić on a season-long loan deal from Slovan Bratislava.

On 27 July, Pafos announced the signing of Daniel Antosch from Liefering.

On 29 July, Pafos announced the signing of Franko Kovačević from Hoffenheim II.

On 3 August, Pafos announced the signing of Martin Pajić from HNK Šibenik.

On 16 August, Pafos announced the signing of Magomedkhabib Abdusalamov from Rodina Moscow.

On 19 August, Pafos announced the signing of Jairo from Hajduk Split.

On 24 August, Pafos announced the signing of Ailton from Midtjylland.

On 27 August, Pafos announced the signing of Demetris Moulazimis from Enosis Neon Paralimni.

On 30 August, Pafos announced the signing of Vlad Dragomir from Virtus Entella.

On 7 September, Edgar Babayan left Riga by mutual consent before signing for Pafos.

On 7 January, Pafos announced the signing of Talys on loan from NK Osijek for the remainder of season.

On 9 January, Pafos announced the signing of Eirik Hestad on a free transfer after his Molde contract had expired.

On 14 January, Pafos announced the signing of Hamadi Al Ghaddioui from VfB Stuttgart for an undisclosed fee.

On 27 January, Pafos announced the signing of Ivan Tomečak from Rijeka, and the departure of Edgar Babayan.

On 10 May, Darko Milanič was relieved of his duties as Head Coach with immediate affect, with Technical Advisor Míchel Salgado being appointed as Acting Head Coach for the remaining two games of the season on 14 May.

Squad

Out on loan

Left club during season

Transfers

In

 Leite's move was announced on the above date, but was not finalised until 1 August 2021.

Loans in

Out

Loans out

Released

 Transfers were announced on the above date, but didn't come into effect until 1 July 2022 once their contracts expired on 30 June 2022.

Friendlies

Competitions

Overview

Cyta Championship

Regular season

League table

Results summary

Results by results

Results

Championship round

League table

Results summary

Results by results

Results

Cypriot Cup

Squad statistics

Appearances and goals

|-
|colspan="14"|Players away on loan:

|-
|colspan="14"|Players who appeared for Pafos but left during the season:

|}

Goal scorers

Clean sheets

Disciplinary record

References

Pafos FC seasons
Pafos FC season